Boskabad (also Romanized as Bosḵābād and Bosk Ābād) is a village in Nimbeluk Rural District, Nimbeluk District, Qaen County, South Khorasan Province, Iran. At the 2006 census, its population was 393, in 118 families.

References 

Populated places in Qaen County